Learmonth may refer to:

People
 George-Yuri Andreevich Learmonth (1590s–1633) was a Scottish soldier in Russian service.
 Ian Learmonth, British police officer
 James Rögnvald Learmonth (1895–1967), Scottish surgeon
 John Learmonth of Dean, Lord Provost of Edinburgh 1831–33, after whom the Learmonth district of Edinburgh is named.
 Noel Fulford Learmonth (1880–1970), Australian author, historian and naturalist
 Okill Massey Learmonth VC, MC (1894–1917), Canadian recipient of the Victoria Cross
 Thomas Learmonth, also known as Thomas the Rhymer (c.1220–c.1298), Scottish laird
 Thomas Livingstone Learmonth (1818–1903), early Victorian settler who established land around Ballarat, Victoria
 Tom Livingstone-Learmonth (1906-1931), British hurdler

Places
 Learmonth, Edinburgh, a district of the Scottish capital
 Learmonth, Victoria, Australia
 RAAF Learmonth, Royal Australian Air Force base near Exmouth on the north-west coast of Western Australia

See also
 Clan Learmonth, a Scottish clan (armigerous clan)
 Learmonth, noble family of Scottish origin. 
 Mikhail Lermontov, (1814 – 1841) was a Russian Romantic writer, poet and painter, sometimes called "the poet of the Caucasus", the most important Russian poet after Alexander Pushkin's death in 1837 and the greatest figure in Russian Romanticism. Family was branch of the Scottish clan Learmonth, and can be traced to Yuri (George) Learmonth, a Scottish officer in the Polish-Lithuanian service who settled in Russia in the middle of the 17th century. George Learmonth was a descent from the famed 13th-century Scottish poet Thomas Learmonth